Morelet's crocodile (Crocodylus moreletii), also known as the Mexican crocodile or Belize crocodile, is a modest-sized crocodilian found only in fresh waters of the Atlantic regions of Mexico, Belize and Guatemala. It is a Least Concern species. 
The species has a fossil record in Guatemala.

Taxonomy and etymology
Morelet's crocodile was first described in 1850 in Mexico by the French naturalist Pierre Marie Arthur Morelet. The species was subsequently named after him. It was long confused with the American and Cuban crocodiles because of similar characteristics and an ambiguous type locality. It was not generally accepted as a separate species until the 1920s.

Evolution
The genus Crocodylus likely originated in Africa and radiated outwards towards Southeast Asia and the Americas, although an Australia/Asia origin has also been considered. Phylogenetic evidence supports Crocodylus diverging from its closest recent relative, the extinct Voay of Madagascar, around 25 million years ago, near the Oligocene/Miocene boundary.

Phylogeny
Below is a cladogram based on a 2018 tip dating study by Lee & Yates simultaneously using morphological, molecular (DNA sequencing), and stratigraphic (fossil age) data, as revised by the 2021 Hekkala et al. paleogenomics study using DNA extracted from the extinct Voay.

Characteristics
Morelet's crocodile has a very broad snout with 66 to 68 teeth when they are fully mature. They are dark grayish-brown in color with dark bands and spots on the body and the tail. This is similar to other crocodiles, like the American crocodile, but the Morelet is somewhat darker. Juvenile crocodiles are bright yellow with some dark bands. The crocodile's iris is silvery brown. They have four short legs, giving them a rather sprawling gait, and a long tail, which is used for swimming. The hind feet of the crocodiles are webbed. They have very explosive capabilities because of their strong muscles and are fast runners.

Size
Morelet's crocodile is small compared to most other crocodiles. The males can become larger than the females. Overall, this species is similar in appearance and morphology to the Cuban and the larger American crocodiles.

Distribution and habitat

Morelet's crocodile can be found in freshwater habitats in Central America and along the Gulf of Mexico stretching through Belize, Guatemala, and to Mexico. The Belizean pine forests are an example of the type of ecoregion in which they occur.

In their freshwater habitats, they prefer isolated areas that are secluded. This species of crocodile can mainly be found in freshwater swamps and marshes which are located inland, and in large rivers and lakes. Both of these habitats are forested to help add cover.

The Morelet can also be found along the coast in brackish waters and the grassy savannas on the Yucatán Peninsula. These crocodiles become much more distributed during the rainy seasons when flooding occurs and it is easier for them to move elsewhere.

Juvenile crocodiles live in very dense cover to protect them from other predators that might be in the area and will remain there until they become older and able to fend for themselves. Adult crocodiles are known to dig out burrows during dry seasons in their area. The range of this crocodile can overlap with the American crocodile, which can sometimes lead to them being confused with one another.

Recently, the Morelet's crocodile has been introduced into the Rio Grande (Rio Bravo in Mexico). Several newspaper outlets on the Mexican side of the border report of reptiles inhabiting the river appearing not to be the American alligator which is native to Texas, but the Morelet's crocodile which is native to Tamaulipas from San Fernando southward. Crocodiles have been seen in the cities of Matamoros, Reynosa and as far north as Nuevo Laredo. The sightings have prompted several municipal police departments to put up signs warning people about entering the river.

Biology and behavior

Hunting and diet
Like most crocodilians, Morelet's crocodiles are highly opportunistic and will prey on practically anything that they can overpower that comes in their territories. Juvenile crocodiles feed largely on fish and insects until they become bigger and more capable of bringing down larger prey. Adults largely prey on small mammals, birds, other reptiles and fish, as well as gastropods, crustaceans and other invertebrates. These small mammals can include domesticated animals like cats and dogs. Large specimens have been shown to be able to overtake large prey. Dogs and goats have been taken by this species, including a record of a  adult killing an English sheepdog which weighed at least . Adults have also been recorded eating even larger animals, including adult and nearly-grown cattle and an adult tapir, although these have been cases of scavenging on caracasses, with the tapir having been killed by a jaguar (it is possible that the jaguar was present when the crocodile fed). Crocodiles have been known to be cannibalistic towards smaller specimens. Although previously thought to be inoffensive, there have been recent reports that the species has attacked humans on multiple occasions and at least 12 documented human fatalities have occurred. Despite the relatively small size of the species, large adult Morelet's are aggressive and easily capable of overpowering an unaware human near the water. Due to partial consumption, recorded fatal attacks are likely predatory rather than defensive in nature.

Reproduction

Breeding usually takes place between April and June and the eggs are laid before the start of the rainy season. Morelet's crocodiles are unique among North American crocodiles in that they build mound nests only, and not mound and hole nests. A female crocodile can lay between 20 and 45 eggs and nests have been found containing eggs from more than one female. The eggs are buried and the nests are guarded by females. After the eggs have hatched the female crocodile will carry her young to the water where they are protected by both parents and will later leave them to fend for themselves. Females are highly protective of their young and have reportedly been observed to aggressively displace intruders and humans if distress calls of the baby crocodiles are heard and even father crocodiles have been observed to spring to the defense of young crocodiles. In captivity, juvenile crocodiles are treated aggressively by adult crocodiles but never hatchlings.

Conservation
Morelet's crocodile has long been threatened by habitat destruction and illegal hunting. Both of these factors have significantly lowered their populations. It was hunted for its hide during the 1940s and 1950s because high-quality leather can be made from their skins.

Notes

References

External links

 "Crocodile Sighting in Corpus Christi"
 "Species Name" Morelets Crocodile; Outcome: Fatal"—CrocBITE Live Feed
 Britton, Adam. "How Long Do Crocodiles Live for?" Crocodilian Conservation Database. 2002.

Crocodylidae
Reptiles of Mexico
Reptiles of Belize
Reptiles of Guatemala
Reptiles of the Caribbean
Least concern biota of Mexico
Least concern biota of North America
Reptiles described in 1851
Taxa named by Auguste Duméril
Taxa named by Gabriel Bibron
Crocodilians of North America